In Love and War is a 1958 CinemaScope and DeLuxe Color film set in World War II, directed by Philip Dunne. It is based on the 1957 novel The Big War by Anton Myrer. Myrer was a former Marine wounded during the Second Battle of Guam in 1944.

Plot summary
The film traces the progress of three Marines on shore leave in San Francisco during World War II. One of the men, Nico (Jeffrey Hunter), is a seasoned, decorated platoon sergeant; the second, Frankie (Robert Wagner), is a perennial goof-off, who drinks too much; and the third, Alan (Bradford Dillman), is an intellectual from a wealthy family. He has joined the Marines, despite his father's protests.

Nico proposes and marries his pregnant girlfriend Andrea (Hope Lange). A drunken Frankie fights with Charlie Stanton (Murvyn Vye), his hateful stepfather, who thinks him a coward. The wealthy Alan catches his fiancée, Sue (Dana Wynter), with another man.

Lorraine (Sheree North), who is in love with Frankie, has joined the military as a WAVE. She introduces his friend Alan to her roommate Kalai (France Nuyen), a nurse of Hawaiian-French heritage. They all go to Lorraine's apartment, where Frankie first passes out, then wakes up screaming at the thought of returning to the war. Lorraine decides to leave him. Kalai professes her love for Alan.

The three men return to the Pacific front. Frankie initially shows cowardice and Nico slaps some sense into him. Later, Frankie saves Alan and is honored for his heroism. Alan becomes ill with dengue fever and when a wounded Japanese soldier calls out to him for help, he tries to give the Japanese soldier some water but Nico shoots the wounded soldier and reveals to Alan and the other marines that a grenade was hidden under the wounded soldier as a trap. Alan then begins to question the futility of the war. When an advancing enemy tank threatens the platoon, Nico singlehandedly blows up the tank, but dies from his wounds.

Back home, Kalai visits Sue in the hospital after she tries to commit suicide. Suffering from alcohol withdrawal, Sue dies during the visit.

The war ends and Alan returns to Kalai and becomes a professor at the local university. Frankie, now promoted to sergeant, brings Nico's last love letter home to Andrea, who has given birth to their child. Andrea tells Frankie, who has decided to stay in the Marines that she would like to see him again.

Cast
 Robert Wagner as Pvt. Frank "Frankie" O'Neill
 Dana Wynter as Sue Trumbell
 Jeffrey Hunter as Plt Sgt. Nico Kantaylis
 Hope Lange as Andrea Lenaine
 Bradford Dillman as PFC Alan Newcombe
 Sheree North as Lorraine
 France Nuyen as Kalai Ducanne
 Mort Sahl as Danny Krieger
 Steven Gant as Babe Ricardo
 Harvey Stephens as Amory Newcombe
 Paul Comi as Father Wallensack
 Joe Di Reda as Capistron
 Buck Class as Derek
 Murvyn Vye as Charlie Scanlon 
 Mary Patton as Grace Scanlon 
 Veronica Cartwright as Allie O'Neill 
 Brian Corcoran as Bobby O'Neill 
 Nelson Leigh as Lt. Col. Herron 
 Ray Montgomery as Lieutenant 
 James Philbrook as Sue's Boyfriend

Production
Jerry Wald, who had a deal with Fox, bought the screen rights to The Big War in March 1957. It was one of a number of war novels bought by Fox at the time, including The Young Lions, The Hunters and The Enemy Below.

At one stage the film was known as Hell Raisers before being titled In Love and War. Wald wanted Lee Remick, Richard Widmark and Ben Gazzara to play the leads.

Bradford Dillman and Robert Wagner were cast in April 1958. Jeff Hunter and France Nuyen were cast in June.

Filming started in June 1958. Dunne says filming started with "half a script" and he had to do writing on location in the Pacific.

On his comedy album 1960 or Look Forward In Anger, Sahl said he wrote 16 pages of dialogue for his character and the other Marines but most of the material was edited from the final print. Director Phillip Dunne asked the producer Jerry Wald why Sahl's name was not on the posters or advertisements. Wald responded that he was told that there was nothing in Sahl's contract that required him to receive any billing. Wald signed Sahl on to a personal contract with the intention of casting him as a beatnik in The Best of Everything (1959)

See also
 List of American films of 1958

References

External links
 
 
 
 

1958 films
American war drama films
American World War II films
20th Century Fox films
1950s war drama films
Films about the United States Marine Corps
Films based on American novels
Films based on military novels
Films directed by Philip Dunne
Films scored by Hugo Friedhofer
Pacific War films
Films with screenplays by Edward Anhalt
1958 drama films
CinemaScope films
1950s English-language films
1950s American films